Riders of the Badlands is a 1941 American Western film directed by Howard Bretherton and written by Betty Burbridge. The film stars Charles Starrett, Russell Hayden, Cliff Edwards, Ilene Brewer, Kay Hughes and Roy Barcroft. The film was released on December 18, 1941, by Columbia Pictures.

Plot

Cast          
Charles Starrett as Steve Langdon / Mac Collins
Russell Hayden as 'Lucky' Barton
Cliff Edwards as Bones Mallory
Ilene Brewer as Flo
Kay Hughes as Celia
Roy Barcroft as Captain Martin
Rick Anderson as Sheriff Taylor
Edith Leach as Ellen Taylor
Ethan Laidlaw as Bill
Harry Cording as Higgins
Hal Price as Warden James

References

External links
 

1941 films
American Western (genre) films
1941 Western (genre) films
Columbia Pictures films
Films directed by Howard Bretherton
American black-and-white films
1940s English-language films
1940s American films